Madaripur-1 is a constituency represented in the Jatiya Sangsad (National Parliament) of Bangladesh since 1991 by Noor-E-Alam Chowdhury Liton of the Awami League.

Boundaries 
The constituency encompasses Shibchar Upazila.

History 
The constituency was created in 1984 from the Faridpur-13 constituency when the former Faridpur District was split into five districts: Rajbari, Faridpur, Gopalganj, Madaripur, and Shariatpur.

Members of Parliament

Elections

Elections in the 2018s

Elections in the 2010s 
Noor-E-Alam Chowdhury Liton was re-elected unopposed in the 2014 general election after opposition parties withdrew their candidacies in a boycott of the election.

Elections in the 2000s

Elections in the 1990s 

Ilias Ahmed Chowdhury died in office. Noor-E-Alam Chowdhury Liton, his son, was elected in a September 1991 by-election.

References

External links
 

Parliamentary constituencies in Bangladesh
Madaripur District